The permissive mood is a grammatical mood that indicates that the action is permitted by the speaker.

In Lithuanian
It is one of the optative mood forms that survived in Lithuanian. For example, the permissive mood of verb tekù (to run) is tetekiẽ (let him run). This form has also meaning of third-person dual and plural. One of the signs of the permissive mood is the prefix te-, of obscure origin; it is added (for primary verbs, which have bisyllabic stem in present tense and stressed ending in first-person present tense) to the form of third-person singular ancient optative mood or to the form of third-person singular indicative mood for the secondary verbs and for those primary verbs, which has unstressed ending in the first-person singular form (for example, the permissive mood of bė́gu is tebė́ga).

References 

Grammatical moods